Yelamanchili is a village and mandal headquarters of Yelamanchili mandal in West Godavari district of the Indian state of Andhra Pradesh.

Geography 
Yelamanchiliis located on Eastern coastal plains in Coastal Andhra region.

References

External links 
 web site

Villages in West Godavari district